Georgios Machlelis (born 10 May 1991) is a Greek footballer who last played for Platanias.


Club career

Panathinaikos
Machlelis was born in Waiblingen, Germany. In 2009, he was added to Panathinaikos FC first team by coach Henk Ten Cate and followed the team to Yverdon (district), Switzerland for the summer training. He was roommates with another promising youth Robert Stambolziev. He played as right back defender and as defensive midfielder in the friendly games against SpVgg Greuther Fürth and Budapest Honvéd FC without being substituted, and as a last minutes substitute against TSG 1899 Hoffenheim.

Machlelis was registered for the Champions league game against Sparta Prague (July 2009) in Prague, and for the Greek Superleague 1st-round game against Ergotelis in Crete. Coach Henk Ten Cate seems to have faith in his abilities and will attempt to use him in the starting lineup in future games. The Dutch coach told the reporters "Panathinaikos is working for the future as well, bringing young and talented players who can develop to quality players. Perhaps the best example is Machlelis. He just turned 18. I don't want to put pressure on him, but I believe that so far he is the best young player I have seen in Greece. He is very mature in his game, very intelligent and down to earth personality. One more thing is that he's a good fast learner and a hardworking individual. He's strong and well built, and i have high expectations for him. I will certainly keep him in the squad and he will get some games on his feet this year. He's a very good player with good tactics in his game".

Eintracht Braunschweig

During the 2013–14 Regionalliga season, Machlelis played for the reserve side of Eintracht Braunschweig in Germany.

Niki Volos & Platanias

Machlelis then joined Niki Volos for the 2014–15 Superleague Greece season. On 23 August 2014 he made his debut in the Greek first-tier, in a 1–3 loss at Olympiacos F.C. On 30 January 2015 he signed a six months contract, with a possible year extension, with Super League club Platanias for an undisclosed fee. Unfortunately in his first game with the club against Asteras Tripoli, he faced an injury that kept him out of the squad for almost six months.

International career

Greece U21
Machlelis was called up to the Greece U21 squad for the World Cup 2011 Qualifying game (8 September 2009) against England U21.

Honours

Club
 Panathinaikos
Superleague Greece: Champions, 1
2009–10
Superleague Greece: Runners-up, 1
2010–11
Greek Football Cup: Champions, 1
2010

References

External links
 Panathinaikos FC official website

1991 births
Living people
People from Waiblingen
Sportspeople from Stuttgart (region)
Panathinaikos F.C. players
Citizens of Greece through descent
Greek footballers
Greek expatriate footballers
Super League Greece players
Cypriot First Division players
Ethnikos Achna FC players
Eintracht Braunschweig II players
Niki Volos F.C. players
Association football midfielders
Expatriate footballers in Cyprus
Expatriate footballers in Germany
German people of Greek descent
Sportspeople of Greek descent
Footballers from Baden-Württemberg